Stade Etivallière is a sports stadium located in Saint-Étienne, France. It hosts the matches of CA Saint-Étienne of the Rugby Pro D2. It has a current capacity of 3,000 leading to the club occasionally playing bigger matches at the larger Stade Geoffroy-Guichard, home of AS Saint-Étienne.

Etiv
Rugby union stadiums in France
Buildings and structures in Saint-Étienne
Sport in Saint-Étienne